Pioner is a rural locality (a selo) in Daktuyskoye Rural Settlement of Magdagachinsky District, Amur Oblast, Russia. The population was 30 as of 2018.

Geography 
Pioner is located on northeast of the Amur–Zeya Plain, 70 km east of Magdagachi (the district's administrative centre) by road. Aprelsky is the nearest rural locality.

References 

Rural localities in Magdagachinsky District